The 2012 Marist Red Foxes football team represented Marist College in the 2012 NCAA Division I FCS football season. They were led by 21st year head coach Jim Parady and played their home games at Tenney Stadium at Leonidoff Field. They were a member of the Pioneer Football League. They finished the season 4–7, 3–5 in PFL play to finish in a tie for sixth place.

Schedule

Source: Schedule
November 3's game against San Diego was postponed due to effects from Hurricane Sandy. The Game was reschedule to December 1.

References

Marist
Marist Red Foxes football seasons
Marist Red Foxes football